

J 

 
 
 
 
 
 
 
 
 
 
 
 
 
 
 
 
 
 
 
 
 
 
 
 
 
 
 
 
 
 
 
 
 
 
 
 
 
 1017 Jacqueline
 
 
 
 
 
 
 
 
 
 
 
 
 
 
 
 
 
 
 
 
 
 
 
 
 
 
 
 
 
 
 
 
 
 
 
 
 
 
 
 
 
 
 
 
 
 
 
 
 
 
 
 
 
 
 
 
 
 
 
 
 
 
 
 
 
 
 
 
 
 
 
 
 
 
 
 
 
 
 
 
 
 
 
 
 
 
 
 
 
 
 
 
 
 
 
 
 
 
 
 
 
 
 
 
 
 
 
 
 
 
 2028 Janequeo
 
 
 
 
 
 
 
 
 
 
 
 2324 Janice
 383 Janina
 
 
 
 
 
 
 
 
 
 
 
 
 
 
 
 
 
 
 
 
 
 
 
 
 7796 Járacimrman
 
 
 
 
 
 1558 Järnefelt
 
 
 
 
 1110 Jaroslawa
 
 
 
 
 3353 Jarvis
 
 
 
 
 
 
 6063 Jason
 
 
 
 
 
 
 
 
 
 
 
 
 
 
 
 
 
 
 
 
 
 
 
 
 
 
 
 
 
 
 
 
 
 
 
 
 
 
 
 
 
 
 
 1461 Jean-Jacques
 
 
 
 
 
 
 
 
 
 
 
 
 
 
 1281 Jeanne
 
 
 
 
 
 
 8116 Jeanperrin
 
 
 
 5899 Jedicke
 
 
 
 
 
 
 
 
 
 
 
 
 
 
 
 
 
 
 
 
 
 
 
 9564 Jeffwynn
 
 
 
 
 
 
 
 
 
 
 
 526 Jena
 
 
 
 
 
 
 
 
 
 
 
 
 
 
 
 
 
 
 
 
 
 
 
 
 
 
 
 
 
 
 
 
 
 
 607 Jenny
 
 
 
 
 
 
 
 1719 Jens
 
 
 5900 Jensen
 
 
 
 
 
 
 
 
 
 
 
 
 
 
 
 
 1414 Jérôme
 116903 Jeromeapt
 
 
 
 
 
 
 
 
 
 
 
 
 
 
 
 
 
 
 
 
 
 
 
 
 
 
 
 
 
 
 
 
 
 
 
 
 549 Jessonda
 
 
 
 544 Jetta
 
 
 
 145534 Jhongda
 4760 Jia-xiang
 
 
 
 
 
 
 
 
 
 
 
 
 
 2080 Jihlava
 
 
 
 
 
 
 
 2874 Jim Young
 2143 Jimarnold
 
 
 
 
 
 
 
 
 
 
 
 
 
 
 
 
 
 
 
 
 
 
 
 
 
 
 
 
 
 
 
 
 21873 Jindřichůvhradec
 
 
 
 
 
 
 
 
 
 
 
 
 
 
 
 
 
 
 
 
 
 
 
 
 
 
 
 
 
 
 
 
 
 
 
 
 
 
 
 
 
 
 
 
 
 
 
 
 
 
 
 
 
 
 
 
 
 726 Joëlla
 
 
 
 
 
 
 
 
 1524 Joensuu
 
 
 
 
 
 
 
 
 
 
 
 
 
 127 Johanna
 
 
 
 
 
 
 
 
 
 
 
 
 
 
 
 
 
 
 4525 Johnbauer
 
 
 
 
 
 
 
 
 
 
 
 
 
 
 
 
 
 
 
 
 
 
 
 
 
 
 
 
 
 
 
 
 
 
 
 
 
 
 
 
 
 
 
 
 
 
 
 
 
 
 
 
 
 
 
 
 8026 Johnmckay
 
 
 
 
 
 
 
 
 
 
 
 
 
 
 
 
 
 
 
 
 
 
 
 
 
 
 
 
 
 
 
 
 5905 Johnson
 
 
 
 
 
 
 
 
 
 
 
 
 
 
 
 
 
 
 
 899 Jokaste
 
 836 Jole
 
 
 
 
 
 
 
 
 
 
 
 
 
 
 
 
 
 
 
 
 
 
 
 
 
 
 18117 Jonhodge
 
 
 
 
 
 
 
 
 
 
 
 
 
 
 
 
 
 
 
 
 
 
 
 
 
 
 
 
 
 
 1423 Jose
 
 649 Josefa
 
 
 
 
 
 
 
 
 
 
 
 
 
 
 
 
 
 
 
 303 Josephina
 
 
 
 
 
 
 
 
 
 
 
 
 
 
 
 
 
 
 
 
 
 
 
 
 
 
 
 
 
 
 
 
 
 
 
 
 
 
 
 
 
 
 
 921 Jovita
 
 
 
 
 
 
 
 
 
 
 
 
 
 
 
 
 
 
 
 
 
 652 Jubilatrix
 
 
 948 Jucunda
 
 
 
 664 Judith
 
 
 
 
 
 
 139 Juewa
 
 
 
 1248 Jugurtha
 
 
 
 
 
 
 
 
 89 Julia
 
 
 
 
 
 
 
 
 816 Juliana
 
 
 
 20325 Julianoey
 
 
 
 
 
 
 
 
 
 
 
 
 
 
 
 
 
 
 
 
 
 
 
 
 
 
 
 
 
 
 
 
 
 
 
 
 
 
 3 Juno
 
 
 
 
 
 
 
 
 3537 Jürgen
 
 
 4388 Jürgenstock
 
 
 
 
 11948 Justinehénin
 
 
 
 
 
 
 
 269 Justitia
 
 
 
 1183 Jutta
 
 
 
 
 
 605 Juvisia
 
 
 
 
 
 1500 Jyväskylä

See also 
 List of minor planet discoverers
 List of observatory codes

References 
 

Lists of minor planets by name